The Devil's Deal is a 2021 South Korean crime drama film directed by Lee Won-tae. It stars Cho Jin-woong, Lee Sung-min and Kim Mu-yeol. It was released theatrically in South Korea on March 1, 2023.

Premise 
Betrayals and conspirations of three men who make dangerous deals for money, power, and honor.

Synopsis 
Set in Busan in 1992, the story revolves around Hae-woong (Cho Jin-woong), a candidate for the National Assembly, Sun-tae (Lee Sung-min) a hidden powerhouse in politics, and Pil-do (Kim Mu-yeol), a gangster who fight fiercely to overturn the game by holding secret documents that will shake the Republic of Korea.

Cast 
 Cho Jin-woong as Jeon Hae-woong
 Lee Sung-min as Kwon Soon-tae
 Kim Mu-yeol as Kim Pil-do
 Son Yeo-eun as Sang-mi
 Kim Min-jae as Jang-ho
 Won Hyeon-jun as Jeong Han-mo
 Park Se-jin as Dan-ah
 Kim Yoon-seong as manager Park
 Son Yeo-eun as Sang-mi
 Lee Sang-won as Chief Ahn
 Yoo Seung-mok as Ahn Gyu-hwan
 Choi Min-cheol as manager

Production 
Principal photography began on April 30, 2020.

Release 
The film made its world premiere at the 25th Fantasia International Film Festival on August 7, 2021. The film also invited to the 41st Hawaii International Film Festival in November 2021 and the 20th Florence Korean Film Festival in April 2022.

References

External links
 
 
 

2021 films
2021 thriller drama films
2020s Korean-language films
South Korean political drama films
Films set in Busan
Films set in 1992